Antonio Gerardo Mariscal Abascal (2 July 1915 – 29 October 2010) was a lawyer and Olympic-level diver from  Mexico, who is considered by the Mexican Olympic Committee (COM) as a pioneer of Mexican sport.

In 1931, he won the National Diving Championship. He and his older brothers Alonso and Federico achieved Olympic history at the 1932 Olympics. They are the only three brothers to have competed in the same diving event. Effective with the 1948 Summer Olympics, the IOC has restricted that a country can have only two representatives in any single diving event. At the 1932 Olympics, he finished 12th in the 3m Springboard. His younger brother Diego competed at the 1948 Olympics.

At the 1935 Central American and Caribbean Games, he won the 5m Platform event and was second in 3m Springboard.

He served as president of the Mexican Swimming Federation from 1960–66, and is among the founders of bodies that oversee aquatic sports in the Americas (ASUA) and Central America/Caribbean (CCCAN).

In 1988 he received a Silver Olympic Order award from the International Olympic Committee. In 2008, he was bestowed a permanent COM membership.

Notes

References

External links
 
 
 

1915 births
2010 deaths
Mexican male divers
Olympic divers of Mexico
Divers at the 1932 Summer Olympics
Recipients of the Olympic Order
Divers from Mexico City